Alucita coffeina is a species of moth of the family Alucitidae. It is known from Gabon.

References

Endemic fauna of Gabon
Alucitidae
Fauna of Gabon
Moths of Africa
Moths described in 1958
Taxa named by Pierre Viette